Boonchu Ruangkit (born 12 May 1956) is a Thai professional golfer who plays on the Champions Tour.

Early life
As a young man, Boonchu tried for a career in kick boxing, but he gave it up after being knocked out cold in his third bout. He made his mark in golf when he won the 1985 Australian Amateur.

Professional career
Boonchu turned professional in 1986. He has won five titles on the Asian Tour since its first modern season in 1995, and has several other victories to his name. He was the runner-up on the Asian Tour Order of Merit in 1995 and also made the top ten in 1998 and 2004. In the latter year he won the Thailand Open for the second time in his career at the age of 47.

In 2006, Boonchu turned 50 and became eligible to play in senior tournaments. He finished first in the 2006 Champions Tour Qualifying School and joined the Champions Tour in 2007. In 2010, he joined the European Senior Tour and won four events (including three straight) and the Order of Merit.

Amateur wins
1985 Australian Amateur, Putra Cup (individual and team)

Professional wins (19)

Asian Tour wins (5)

Asian Tour playoff record (3–1)

All Thailand Golf Tour wins (6)
2000 TPC Championships
2002 TPC Championships
2003 Singha Classic
2004 Chevrolet Championship
2006 Singha Masters, Singha E-San Open

Asia Golf Circuit wins (2)
1992 Thailand Open
1998 Mercuries Masters (Taiwan)

European Senior Tour wins (5)

European Senior Tour playoff record (1–0)

Japan PGA Senior Tour wins (1)
2013 ISPS Handa Cup - Satsukibare Senior Masters

Team appearances
Amateur
Eisenhower Trophy (representing Thailand): 1984

Professional
Dunhill Cup (representing Thailand): 1988, 1990, 1991, 1992
World Cup (representing Thailand): 1988, 1989, 1994
Dynasty Cup (representing Asia): 2005 (winners)

See also
List of golfers with most Asian Tour wins

External links

Boonchu Ruangkit
Asian Tour golfers
PGA Tour Champions golfers
European Senior Tour golfers
Boonchu Ruangkit
1956 births
Living people